The 1992 United States Open Cup was the 79th edition of the soccer tournament to crown the national champion of the United States. 

The San Jose Oaks (SFDML) won the cup 2–1 against Vasco da Gama (LISA) of Bridgeport, Connecticut in a match played at Kuntz Stadium in Indianapolis, Indiana.

Bracket

Regional semifinals 
I Bridgeport Vasco da Gama (CT) 2-1 New York Greek Americans (NY) 
I Fairfax Spartans (VA) 3-1 Philadelphia United German Hungarians (PA)
II Indianapolis Inferno SC (IN) 5-2 Bavarian Leinenkugel SC (WI)
II St. Louis Scott Gallacher (MO) 1-0 Chicago Italian-American Maroons (IL) 
III Dallas Rockets (TX) 5-0 Galveston Norte America (TX) 
III FC Dallas (TX) 1-0 St. Petersburg Kickers (FL) 
IV Kells Celtic (OR) 2-0 Flamengo (UT)
IV San Jose Oaks (CA) 2-0 Santa Barbara (CA)

Regional Finals 
I  Fairfax Spartans (VA) 0-1 Bridgeport Vasco da Gama (LISA)
II Indianapolis Inferno SC (IN)  2-0 St.Louis Scott Gallacher (MO) 
III Dallas Rockets (USISL) 2-1 FC Dallas (LSSA) 
IV San Jose Oaks (SFDML) 3-0 Kells Celtic (OR)

Semifinals 
Bridgeport Vasco da Gama 2-0 Dallas Rockets 
San Jose Oaks 3-1 Indianapolis Inferno SC

Championship 

Tournament MVP: John Hughes (San Jose)

External links
 1992 U.S. Open Cup results

References 

U.S. Open Cup
Cup